is a Japanese fashion model and actress from Fukuoka, Japan.  She got her first big break in 1995, working for Benetton, after which she represented Japan at the global Elite Model Look '95. More magazine work followed.

Shiina made her film debut in 1998 with Open House. She also published a book of photographs and poems, entitled No Filter, Only Eyes, that same year. She is recognized internationally for her role as the psychopathic Asami Yamazaki in Takashi Miike's Audition, and as the vengeful police officer Ruka in Yoshihiro Nishimura's Tokyo Gore Police.

Filmography

 Audition (オーディション) (1999) as Asami Yamazaki (山崎麻美)
 Eureka (2000) as Keiko Kōno
 Harmful Insect (害虫) as Music Teacher (2002)
 A Day on the Planet (2003) as Yamada's Lover
 Sky High (2003) (TV) as Izuko
 Jam Films 2: Fastener (2004) as Actress
 Animusu anima (2005) as Sui
 Tokyo Gore Police (2008) as Ruka
 Vampire Girl vs. Frankenstein Girl (2009) as Monami's mother
 Outrage (2010) as Jun
 Helldriver (2010) as Rikka
 The Profane Exhibit (segment: The Hell Chef) (2013) as The Hell Chef
 Use the Eyeballs! (2015)
 The Ninja War of Torakage (2015) as Gensai Shinonome
 Kazoku Gokko (2015)
 Kodoku Meatball Machine (2017)

External links
  
 Shiina's JMDb Listing

1976 births
Living people
Japanese actresses
Actors from Fukuoka Prefecture
Japanese female models
Models from Fukuoka Prefecture